Key Sounds Label is a Japanese independent record label based in Osaka, Japan, that specializes in trance music. The label formed in 2001 as a brand of the publishing company VisualArt's and was established to catalog and release music related to visual novels produced by the brand Key, also under VisualArt's. When Key Sounds Label formed, Jun Maeda, Shinji Orito, and Magome Togoshi were Key's signature composers and have continued to produce the majority of the music on the label, though Togoshi resigned in October 2006 and is no longer affiliated with Key or VisualArt's. Key and VisualArt's released one single and two remix albums between 1999 and 2000, leading to the formation of Key Sounds Label the following year. The first official releases on the label were Work-S' debut (and only) studio album Humanity... and Lia's debut single "Natsukage / Nostalgia" at the convention Comiket 60 in 2001. The first release to chart on Japan's Oricon charts was the Clannad Original Soundtrack released in 2004. Between 2006 and 2008, eight more releases—five singles and three albums—also charted on Oricon. The six singles and two albums released for the anime series Angel Beats! charted on Oricon in 2010.

Key Sounds Label's roster features Japanese bands and singers, several of which originated from the I've Sound techno/trance music production group under VisualArt's, such as Ayana, Lia, Mell, and Eiko Shimamiya. Other artists including Annabel, Chata, Eufonius, Karuta, LiSA, Marina, Runa Mizutani, Psychic Lover, Rita, Harumi Sakurai, Haruka Shimotsuki, Keiko Suzuki, Miyako Suzuta, Aoi Tada, Tomoe Tamiyasu, and Nagi Yanagi have also released records through the label. Key Sounds Label catalogs their releases on three indexes: KSLA/KSLM, KSLC and KSLV. The albums on KSLA/KSLM and KSLC are released on CD format, while video albums on KSLV are released on DVD and Blu-ray Disc.

Catalog

Under Visual Arts

Under Key Sounds Label

KSLA/KSLM

KSLC

KSLV 

"—" denotes unassigned catalog numbers or releases not applicable to music artists.

Notes and references

 This album was released on the 12-inch format and was limited to 500 copies.
 This album was released on the 12-inch format and was limited to 500 copies.

General

Specific

External links
Key Sounds Label's official website 

 
Record label discographies
Video game music discographies